The New Era was an official magazine of the Church of Jesus Christ of Latter-day Saints (LDS Church) from 1971 to 2020. First published in January 1971 along with the Ensign and the Friend, the New Era'''s intended audience was the church's youth.Noyce, David. "Your quick A-to-Z guide to Mormonism — Part II", The Salt Lake Tribune, 11 April 2016. Retrieved on 24 March 2020. The magazine replaced the similarly themed The Improvement Era, a periodical published from 1897 to 1970.

In its first issue, the editor of the New Era explained the rationale for its creation, stating:By direction of the First Presidency, the New Era is the publication arm of the Church to the unmarried persons of the kingdom—those from twelve up to marriage. It will reflect those qualities that have given rise to the Lord's confidence in youth: sincerity, authenticity, intellectual stimulation, and inspiration. Regular features 
The New Era regularly included articles written by general authorities of the LDS Church on gospel topics, as well as articles contributed by other church members on topics such as preparing for marriage, media and entertainment, and the family. Poems, artwork, tips for coping with life's challenges, and true stories of inspiration, are also commonplace. Other regular features included questions and answers (a question for the youth (e.g., "How can I know I've truly been forgiven after I've repented?") and readers' responses), and the New Era poster (or MormonAd).

Replacement
In August 2020, the LDS Church announced that the New Era would cease publication in at the end of 2020 and would be replaced by a new magazine named For the Strength of Youth''. The final issue was dated December 2020.

Editors

Doyle L. Green (1971–75)
Dean L. Larsen (1977–78)
James E. Faust (1979)
M. Russell Ballard (1980–84)
Carlos E. Asay (1985–86)
Hugh W. Pinnock (1987–89)
Rex D. Pinegar (1990–94)
Joe J. Christensen (1994–95)
Jack H. Goaslind (1996–98)
Marlin K. Jensen (1999–2000)
Dennis B. Neuenschwander (2001–04)
Jay E. Jensen (2005–08)
Spencer J. Condie (2008–10)
Paul B. Pieper (2010–12)
Craig A. Cardon (2012–15)
Joseph W. Sitati (2015–17)
Hugo E. Martinez (2017–18)
Randy D. Funk (2018–22)
Randall K. Bennett (2022-  )

See also

 Liahona (magazine)
 List of Latter Day Saint periodicals
 Young Men (organization)
 Young Women (organization)

Notes

External links 
New Era Official site
New Era Online archive
PDF archives of New Era (2001–present)

1971 in Christianity
2020 disestablishments in Utah
The Church of Jesus Christ of Latter-day Saints periodicals
Magazines established in 1971
Magazines disestablished in 2020
Magazines published in Utah
Mass media in Salt Lake City
Monthly magazines published in the United States
Religious magazines published in the United States
Religious works for children
Teen magazines
Young people and the Church of Jesus Christ of Latter-day Saints